"Attention" is a song recorded and produced by American singer-songwriter Charlie Puth for his second studio album Voicenotes (2018). It was written by Puth and Jacob Kasher. A midtempo pop rock track with elements of 1980s soft-soul and funk music, the song finds Puth singing about how he realizes his partner was "just want[ing] attention" from him instead of loving him. It was released digitally through Artist Partner Group and Atlantic Records on April 21, 2017, and later serviced to the radio on May 2, serving as the album's lead single. An accompanying music video was released on April 24, 2017, featuring Puth brooding at the club while scoping out his former partner, later returning home and finding the partner again at his apartment.

Upon its release, "Attention" received widely positive reviews from music critics for its "slick" and "groove-injected" production, further applauding the track as a more refined and mature and polished musical representation for Puth, comparing to his previous releases. Commercially, the song was an international success and became one of Puth's signature songs, reaching the top-ten in over twenty countries, including Australia, Belgium, Canada, Croatia, France, Germany, Hungary, Italy, Lebanon, Malaysia, New Zealand, the Philippines, Poland, Portugal, Romania, Slovakia, South Korea, Spain, Switzerland, the United Kingdom, and the United States, where it peaked at number five for three non-consecutive weeks. By this, the song became his highest and longest charting entry as a solo artist on the Billboard Hot 100 chart to date, as well as his third single to receive a 4× platinum certification from the Recording Industry Association of America (RIAA), for achieving over 4 million certified units in the States.

To promote the song, Puth had his first live performance for "Attention" on The Voice on May 10, 2017, followed by performances on several shows, such as The Tonight Show Starring Jimmy Fallon, The Ellen DeGeneres Show, and The Late Late Show with James Corden. He later performed the song on his third headlining concert tour, titled Voicenotes Tour, throughout 2018.

Background and release
The original idea of "Attention" began to develop in 2016 when Puth started to record bits of the song while he was on tour in Japan. Puth premiered the song in an "immersive music exhibit" in Los Angeles called "The Attention Room" on April 19. The pop-up installation features an LED "infinity tunnel" and is designed to replicate the brain's reaction to receiving attention. Two days later, "Attention" was officially released as the lead single of Puth's second studio album.

Composition
"Attention" is a midtempo pop rock song that features elements of '80s soft-soul and funk. He also utilized the technique of Anti-Drop, where the chorus is minimalistic and hollow. Throughout the song, the singer realizes that his partner only wants to be around him for attention and other ulterior motives instead of loving him for who he is. It is performed in the key of E♭ minor with a tempo of 100 beats per minute. Puth's vocal span from E♭3 to B♭4.

Critical reception
Writing for Idolator, Mike Wass suggested that "Attention" is a "Song of Summer contender". He added that Charlie "is still the boy next door, just a little more jaded and a lot more willing to speak his mind." Praising the song's production, he said that "That boldness also comes through on the production, which Charlie handled himself, chugging along with chunky bass and faint traces of disco." Lars Brandle of Billboard described it as "polished" and "groove-injected."

Music video
The official music video was released on April 24, 2017, on YouTube. It was filmed in Hollywood Hills and directed by Emil Nava. Cameras capture Puth brooding at the club while scoping out a blond girl, played by Samara Weaving. Throughout the song, he realizes that she only wants to be around him for attention and other ulterior motives instead of loving him for who he is. The music video has over 1.4 billion views on YouTube as of January 2023.

Promotion
The song has been used on its first day of release in a popular Snapchat filter. Puth performed "Attention" live for the first time on The Voice on May 10, 2017. He also performed it on The Tonight Show Starring Jimmy Fallon on May 18, 2017. He later performed the song on The Ellen DeGeneres Show on the October 10, 2017 episode, then on The Late Late Show with James Corden on October 11, 2017.

Chart performance
"Attention" has peaked at number five on the Billboard Hot 100, making it Puth's third top ten single, his highest-charting as a lead artist, and his first top 5 hit on the chart since "See You Again". He also led the Radio Songs all-format airplay chart for four weeks.

On Billboard's Dance/Mix Show Airplay, "Attention" gave Puth his first number-one on this chart as a solo artist in its September 2, 2017 issue, eclipsing "See You Again," which peaked at number 3 on this chart in 2015.

Track listing
Digital download
"Attention" – 3:31

Digital download – Remix
"Attention" (Remix) featuring KYLE – 3:38

Digital download – Acoustic
"Attention" (Acoustic) – 3:26

Digital download – Bingo Players remix
"Attention" (Bingo Players remix) – 2:24

Digital download – Oliver Heldens remix
"Attention" (Oliver Heldens remix) – 3:22

Digital download – Lash remix
"Attention" (Lash remix) – 2:55

Digital download – HUGEL remix
"Attention" (HUGEL remix) – 4:36

Digital download – David Guetta remix
"Attention" (David Guetta Remix) – 4:41

Spotify Singles
"Attention"  – 3:42
"I Don't Wanna Know"  – 3:35

 Remix EP "The Unreal Remixes"

 "Attention" (Marie Wilhelmine Anders Remix)7:27
 "Attention" (Einmeier Remix)4:27
 "Attention" (Pyrococcus Remix)8:10

Charts

Weekly charts

Year-end charts

Certifications

Cover
VIXX member Ken (VIXX singer) recorded a cover of the song and uploaded it in his Youtube Channel in April 6, 2021 </ref>

Postmodern Jukebox has also covered the song, with former American Idol contestant Casey Abrams singing the lead vocals.

Release history

References

2017 singles
2017 songs
Charlie Puth songs
Songs written by Charlie Puth
Songs written by Jacob Kasher
Atlantic Records singles
Number-one singles in Israel
American pop rock songs
Number-one singles in Russia